Max Jenkins (born March 13, 1985) is an American actor and writer.  He starred as Max Carnegie in NBC's comedy-drama detective series The Mysteries of Laura. He is also known for his appearances in HBO's acclaimed series High Maintenance.

Career
Jenkins was first seen on High Maintenance in the webisode "Olivia" in 2013, guest-starring opposite Heléne Yorke. BuzzFeed lauded Jenkins and Yorke in their list of "16 Scene-Stealers From TV Comedy" in 2014, while Indiewire praised "Olivia" as "one of the series' strongest and most popular episodes."

Jenkins has also given critically acclaimed performances in various New York theatre productions, notably Unnatural Acts at Classic Stage Company. The play, co-written by Jenkins and other members of the cast, was nominated for three 2012 Drama Desk Awards, including Outstanding Play.

Upon the premiere of The Mysteries of Laura on September 17, 2014, The Los Angeles Times cited Jenkins as "fabulous," adding that he "may deserve a show of his own."

In August 2018, it was announced that Jenkins was cast as Christopher Doyle in the Netflix dark comedy series, Dead to Me.

In 2022, he played Jeff in the world premiere production of Which Way to the Stage off-Broadway.

Personal life
Jenkins was born and raised in New York City.

Filmography

Film

Television

Awards and nominations

References

External links

1985 births
Living people
21st-century American male actors
American male film actors
American male television actors
American male web series actors
American gay actors
American gay writers
LGBT producers
LGBT people from New York (state)
Male actors from New York City